Tinaca Point is a headland in the southern part of Davao Occidental, in the Philippines. It is the southernmost point of Mindanao Island, and according to the International Hydrographic Organization, marks the division point between the Celebes Sea to the west and Philippine Sea to the east.

References

Headlands of the Philippines
Landforms of Davao Occidental